Mesothen zenobia is a moth of the subfamily Arctiinae. It was described by Schaus in 1927. It is found in Brazil.

References

 Natural History Museum Lepidoptera generic names catalog

Mesothen (moth)
Moths described in 1927